David Grier Martin Jr. (born May 24, 1940) is an American retired lawyer, politician, and university administrator. Martin was a candidate for the United States House of Representatives in 1984 and 1986, losing to Alex McMillan. Martin later served as Secretary and a Vice President for the University of North Carolina system and has served as the host of North Carolina Bookwatch, a public access television show.

Early life and education 
Born in Atlanta in 1940, Martin grew up in Davidson, North Carolina, where his father, David Grier Martin, served as president of Davidson College from 1958 to 1968. Martin attended Davidson, where he played on the basketball team for Lefty Driesell. After graduating, he was commissioned in the United States Army. Following completion of Airborne School, Martin served in the United States Army Special Forces. After leaving active duty, he graduated from Yale Law School.

Career 
After graduating from law school, Martin established a legal practice in Charlotte, North Carolina.

In 1984 and 1986, Martin narrowly lost two races for Congress to Alex McMillan. He later served as both the Secretary and a Vice President for the University of North Carolina system. In 1998, he ran for the U.S. Senate, finishing second to John Edwards in the Democratic primary. After that race, Martin took on interim leadership positions at North Carolina Central University, the University of North Carolina at Pembroke, The Trust for Public Land, and the N.C. Clean Water Management Trust Fund.

Martin writes a weekly column that appears in over 40 newspapers across North Carolina, including The Raleigh Telegram, The Chapel Hill News, The Chatham Journal, The Elkin Tribune, Mountain Xpress, The Pilot, and The Randolph Guide. Since 1999, Martin has hosted North Carolina Bookwatch, a literary television show on UNC-TV, North Carolina’s public television network. He also hosts a weekly radio interview show on 97.9 FM and 1360 AM radio station WCHL in Chapel Hill and is the author of "Interstate Eateries," a guide to local restaurants in North Carolina.

Personal life 
He is married and has two adult children, including state legislator Grier Martin. Martin enjoys running and has completed several marathons.

References

External links
 Interstate Eateries
 North Carolina Bookwatch
 WCHL Who's Talking

Davidson Wildcats men's basketball players
Yale Law School alumni
North Carolina Democrats
North Carolina lawyers
Living people
People from Davidson, North Carolina
1940 births